Sophie Alal is a Ugandan writer, lawyer, poet, journalist and cultural critic. She publishes at Deyu African, a cultural heritage initiative. She won the 2010 Beverley Nambozo Poetry Award with Making Modern Love. Her short stories have been published in the Kalahari Review, Lawino Magazine, AfricanColours and START journal. She has worked as a freelance correspondent for The EastAfrican, African Colours magazine and the Global Press Institute. She holds a law degree from Makerere University.

Published works

Short stories
"Here are the children" in
"Making Modern Love" in
"Partaking "
"Debris"

Poetry
"The rebel fell"
"Making modern love"

References 

Living people
Ugandan women short story writers
Ugandan short story writers
21st-century Ugandan women writers
Makerere University alumni
21st-century Ugandan poets
Ugandan women poets
21st-century short story writers
Year of birth missing (living people)